SBS may refer to:

Broadcasting
 SBS Broadcasting Group, Belgium, formerly many countries
 Talpa TV, formerly SBS Broadcasting B.V., Netherlands
 SBS6, Dutch television channel
 SBS9, Dutch television channel
 Special Broadcasting Service, Australia
 SBS (Australian TV channel)
 Seoul Broadcasting System, South Korea
 SBS TV (South Korean TV channel)
 Shizuoka Broadcasting System, Japan
 Spanish Broadcasting System, US
 The South Bank Show, arts television series, UK
 Scottish Broadcasting Service, a proposed service

Organisations
 Satellite Business Systems, a former company
 SBS Bank, New Zealand
 Save British Science, former name of the Campaign for Science and Engineering
 SBS Technologies, owned by GE Automation & Controls
 Society for Biomolecular Sciences, a former learned society
 SongBird Survival, a United Kingdom organization
 Southall Black Sisters, Asian women's group, London, England

Military
 Special Boat Service, United Kingdom
 Special Boat Squadron (Sri Lanka), Sri Lanka Navy

Education
 Saïd Business School, Oxford, England
 SBS Swiss Business School, Zürich
 Shanghai Business School, Shanghai, China
 Solvay Brussels School of Economics and Management (SBS-EM), Universite Libre de Bruxelles, Belgium
 Special Book Services, Brazil
 Stockholm Business School, Sweden
 Stoneleigh-Burnham School, Greenfield, Massachusetts, US
 Swansea Business School, Wales

Transport
 SBS Transit, Singapore
 Select Bus Service, New York City, US
 Saginaw Bay Southern Railway (reporting mark), Mid-Michigan, US
 Seaboard System Railroad, a railroad in the US, predecessor to CSX Transportation
 Steamboat Springs Airport, Steamboat Springs, Colorado, US

Science and technology
 Shaken baby syndrome
 Short bowel syndrome
 Sick building syndrome
 Stimulated Brillouin scattering
 Polystyrene-b-polybutadiene-b-polystyrene block copolymers, for example Kraton 
 (+)-alpha-santalene synthase ((2Z,6Z)-farnesyl diphosphate cyclizing), an enzyme
 (+)-endo-beta-bergamotene synthase ((2Z,6Z)-farnesyl diphosphate cyclizing), an enzyme
 (-)-endo-alpha-bergamotene synthase ((2Z,6Z)-farnesyl diphosphate cyclizing), an enzyme

Computing
 Windows Small Business Server
 Jive (software), formerly Jive SBS
 Smart Battery System, a specification

Sports
 SBS Championship, golf, Hawaii, US
 SBS Invitational, golf, Invercargill, New Zealand
 Social Boston Sports, US

Other uses
 Short barrel shotgun, US legal term
 Silver Bauhinia Star, an honour in Hong Kong
 Solid bleached sulphate, a paperboard grade